Cardan may refer to:

 Gerolamo Cardano or Jerome Cardan (1501–1576), Renaissance mathematician, physician, astrologer, and gambler
 Cornelius Castoriadis (1922–1997), Greek-French philosopher who used the pseudonym Paul Cardan
 Cardan, Gironde, a commune of the Gironde département, in France

See also
 Cardan angle, a type of angle used to describe the orientation of a rigid body with respect to a fixed coordinate system
 Cardan grille, a method of writing secret messages using a grid
 Cardan joint, or universal joint, a joint in a rigid rod that allows the rod to "bend" in any direction
 Cardan shaft, or drive shaft, a vehicle component for transmitting mechanical power and torque and rotation
 Cardan suspension or gimbal, a pivoted support that allows the rotation of an object about a single axis
 Carden (disambiguation)